Sinocharis is a monotypic moth genus of the family Noctuidae. Its only species, Sinocharis korbae, is found in south-eastern Siberia and Japan. Both the genus and species were first described by Püngeler in 1912.

References

Acontiinae
Monotypic moth genera